Baghmara may refer to:

Baghmara, Barisal, a village in south-central Bangladesh
Baghmara (community development block), Jharkhand, India
Baghmara, Dhanbad, Jharkhand, India
Baghmara, India, in Meghalaya state
Bagmara Upazila, Bangladesh

See also
 List of places in Bangladesh named Baghmara